The following lists events that happened during 2015 in Serbia.

Incumbents 
 President: Tomislav Nikolić
 Prime Minister: Aleksandar Vučić

Events

Musical events
Serbia in the Eurovision Song Contest 2015

Sport

Basketball
2014–15 ABA League Champions: KK Crvena zvezda.
2015 Euroleague MVP: Nemanja Bjelica. Serbian players dominated the list.
EuroBasket Women 2015 Champions

Tennis
2015 Novak Djokovic tennis season: ranked no. 1
2015 Laureus World Sports Award for Sportsman of the Year

Football
2015 FIFA U-20 World Cup Champions

Water polo
2015 FINA Men's Water Polo World League Champions

Deaths
26 April: Miladin Stevanović "Cakan" (aged 74), one of the best pilots of Serbia.
3 April: Bogoljub Stepanović (aged 71), president of the Judge Commission of the Football Association of Serbia.
6 April: Darko Broćić (aged 50), audience measurer.
6 April: Konstantin Zečević (aged 94), footballer.

References

 
Years of the 21st century in Serbia
2010s in Serbia
Serbia
Serbia